The 2000 WGC-World Cup took place 7–10 December at the Buenos Aires Golf Club in Buenos Aires, Argentina. It was the 46th World Cup and the first as a World Golf Championship event. 24 countries competed and each country sent two players. The prize money totaled $3,000,000 with $1,000,000 going to the winning pair. The American team of David Duval  and Tiger Woods won by three strokes over the home Argentine team of Ángel Cabrera and Eduardo Romero.

Qualification and format
18 teams qualified based on the Official World Golf Ranking and were six teams via qualifiers.

The tournament was a 72-hole stroke play team event with each team consisting of two players. The first and third days were fourball play and the second and final days were foursomes play.

Teams

Source

Scores

Source

References

World Cup (men's golf)
Golf tournaments in Argentina
International sports competitions hosted by Argentina
 Sports competitions in Buenos Aires
WGC-World Cup
World Cup golf